Joseph-Léon Saint-Jacques (July 13, 1877 – September 24, 1964) was a Canadian provincial politician. He was the Conservative member of the Legislative Assembly of Quebec for Argenteuil from 1925 to 1927.

References

1877 births
1964 deaths
Conservative Party of Quebec MNAs
People from Mirabel, Quebec
Burials at Notre Dame des Neiges Cemetery